DLC may refer to:

Law
 Domestic and light commercial, a type of insurance policy

 Driver License Compact, a US interstate agreement
 Dual-listed company, a corporate structure

Organizations
 Democratic Leadership Council, an American nonprofit political corporation
 Desktop Linux Consortium
 Developmental Learning Centre, for special schools or similar institutions
 Digital Liberty Coalition, an anti-censorship organization in Australia

Science and technology
 Date and lot code, in product tracking; See Lot number
 Diamond-like carbon
 Dioxins and dioxin-like compounds

Computing
 Data Length Code, a field in a CAN bus frame
 Data link connector (automotive)
 Data Link Control, in the OSI networking model
 Development life cycle
 Digital loop carrier
 Discrete logarithm cryptography
 Double-layer capacitor, another name for a supercapacitor
 Downloadable content, extra content released for a video game

Other uses
 Dalian Zhoushuizi International Airport (IATA code), China
 Dead Letter Circus, an Australian band
 Dillen & Le Jeune Cargo, a cargo train operator in Belgium that evolved into Crossrail Benelux
 Diploma of Loughborough Colleges, once awarded by what is now Loughborough University 
 Library of Congress (MARC organization code), of the US Congress
 Dragonlance Classics, a collection of roleplaying game modules from TSR